Milosh Radomir Vladimir Stankovic  (born December 1962) is a former British Army officer and author of the Bosnian war memoire Trusted Mole.

Early years
Stankovic was born in Southern Rhodesia. His father, a naturalised British, was a Royalist Yugoslav during WW2. His mother was British and served with the 8th Army at the battle of El Alamein in Egypt 1942–43, Italy 1944 and in Yugoslavia in 1945. The family returned to London from Rhodesia in 1963. Stankovic was educated at Plymouth College in Devon, England, where he studied classics and was Head of School and head of the Combined Cadet Force.

Military service
He joined the Parachute Regiment in 1981, went to Royal Military Academy Sandhurst in 1982 and was sent to University by the Army to study Russian at Manchester University and at the Minsk State Pedagogical Institute for Foreign Languages in the Soviet Union. He was the only serving British Army officer to have been partly educated in the Soviet Union during the Cold War. He completed the Standard Graduate Course at Sandhurst in 1986 and subsequently served with the British Army in Belize, Northern Ireland, Southern Africa, and with the United Nations forces in Kuwait, Iraq and Bosnia. A fluent speaker of Serbo-Croatian and Russian, he specialised in psychological operations and post-Cold War arms control. He retired from the British Army in 2000 with the rank of major.

Bosnian War
Operating primarily as a Liaison Officer under the pseudonym 'Mike Stanley', he was the longest-serving British soldier with the United Nations Protection Force during the 1992-95 Bosnian War.  In the latter part of his service, he worked directly for General Sir Michael Rose and General Sir Rupert Smith, successive commanders of the United Nations Protection Force in Bosnia in 1994 and 1995. His functions mainly involved mediating, negotiating and troubleshooting ceasefires, hostage releases, and the 1995 Cessation of Hostilities Agreement with Bosnian Serb political and military leaders. Upon his return from Bosnia, Stankovic was appointed Member of the Order of the British Empire for his mediation work.

"Your liaison function in particular between BH Command and Pale was wholly indispensable to the peace process, and I always felt that I knew better than my predecessors the innermost thoughts of the Serbs…it was essential that we had someone who could gain their trust and demonstrate that as peacekeepers we really were impartial.  All this came to a culminating point during the cessation of hostilities negotiations when you provided the 'telephone through the window!’ Without this I doubt we would have got the necessary signatures." General Sir Michael Rose KCB CBE DSO QGM, Adjutant General.

"Major Stankovic has been mine and my predecessor's Liaison Officer with the Bosnian Serb Army since June 1994. He has worked for me for the past four months.  The relationships he has established with key figures, not least the Bosnian Serb Army commander, his knowledge of the language and the background to the war has been invaluable...He has been under considerable pressure, operating alone in isolated circumstances where the threat of hostile activity is ever present and occasionally occurs. Major Stankovic has performed excellently.  His mediation between the warring factions, his representation of me and his advice have all been of critical importance...As a character he is brave and enduring. He is calm and thoughtful under pressure. He is his own man walking his own path." General Sir Rupert Smith KCB DSO OBE QGM, Deputy Supreme Allied Commander in Europe.

"I have no doubts whatsoever. In Bosnia he played an absolute blinder." General Sir Mike Jackson KCB CBE DSO DL, Chief of the General Staff.

Spy Scandal
In October 1997, while at the Joint Services Command and Staff Course, Stankovic was arrested by the Ministry of Defence Police on suspicion of breaches under Section 2b of the 1989 Official Secrets Act. Although he was on police bail for over a year, during which time the MOD Police interviewed several hundred witnesses, no evidence of any wrongdoing was found with which to charge him. In April 1999 the Crown Prosecution Service concluded that there would be no further action against him for lack of evidence. Nonetheless, for a subsequent year, he was investigated by the Royal Military Police's Special Investigations Branch to determine whether violations to the Military Services had been made. In March 2000, the Army concluded that no violations had been found. Meanwhile, Stankovic had resigned from the Army in order to pursue his case against the Ministry of Defence in the Civil Courts (see Litigation below). The events of those years were recorded by Tim Slessor in his book about dissembling and deception in Whitehall, Lying in State, in a chapter entitled: A Soldier’s Story. The Army Board reflected the lack of substance of the allegations and the failure of two investigations to find any evidence of wrongdoing in an unusual letter to Major Stankovic that is not normally written to officers retiring from the Services:

"On the occasion of your retirement from the Army, I am directed by the Army Board to thank you most sincerely for the loyal service you have given since you were commissioned. The Army Board recognises that, in carrying out your duties as an officer, you will have had to make many sacrifices, putting the interests of your Country, the Army and your soldiers before your own. This is very much appreciated and the Army Board wishes formally to express its gratitude for the service you have given and for the excellent contribution you have made." Major General Alistair Irvin, Military Secretary.

Litigation
In October 2007, ten years after his arrest, Stankovic's case against the Ministry of Defence Police finally came to trial in the Royal Courts of Justice.  There were only three torts in law upon which he could rest his claim: Unlawful arrest; trespass to property; and malfeasance in public office (abuse of power) – a tort that had been heard only ten times previously in civil courts and had failed on seven of those occasions. Although the trial judge, the Honourable Mr. Justice Saunders, found that the MOD Police had not abused their power during investigation and held reasonable grounds for suspicion leading to Stankovic's subsequent arrest, he did find that the trespass of Stankovic's property had been inordinate. Furthermore, the trial process revealed additional hitherto unseen disclosure, which finally named Stankovic's original accuser - a former British Army officer. In clearing Stankovic's name, The Honourable Mr. Justice Saunders summed up as follows on 9 November 2007:

"Looked at objectively, there is no doubt that what happened to the Claimant has been unfair and the consequences serious…he was an impressive and realistic witness. He did not overstate his case...He proved himself to be courageous and resourceful in Bosnia and suffered the effects of his time there more than most".

Writing
On 14th April 2000, Stankovic published his own account of his experiences as a Liaison Officer, mediator and negotiator in the Bosnian War – Trusted Mole, A Soldier’s Journey into Bosnia’s Heart of Darkness. Described by The Sunday Times as "By far the best book to have come out of the Balkan Wars" and critically acclaimed in the United States and Europe, this account of troubleshooting in the extreme environment of the Bosnian War informs the philosophical and methodological approach to the agile resolution of conflict and disputes.

Recent years
Consulting & Advisory.  Since leaving the British Army, Stankovic has worked in over eighty countries on five continents as a risk management consultant, and has specialised in business intelligence and new market entry in the Russian Federation. He has been honoured three times by the Emmy Awards in Los Angeles for his work with CBS TV and advised the BBC on developing proactive protection measures for BBC teams in Iraq. His expertise in psychological operations and mediation in cross-cultural environments have led to the development of innovative approaches in the fields of mediation and negotiation using agile and iterative processes for Conflict Resolution and Alternative Dispute Resolution. He uses his expertise both in security and Health & Safety consulting in the creative and media industries with a focus on hostile environments. He is the Principle High Risk Advisor at 1st Option Safety Group as well as being an Accredited Mediator with, and Member of, the Chartered Institute of Arbitrators, specialising in the use of archetypal application in the mediation process.

The Warrior & The Caregiver.  Who cares for the carer? Stankovic's training in psychological warfare found extension and expression as a performance coach in civilian life combining his unusual experiences of overcoming adversity with depth psychology coaching systems such as the Pearson-Marr Archetype Indicator (PMAI). He trained as a coach in the US, principally on Hawaii, in California and at Sedona in Arizona.  Between 2008 and 2014 he suspended his working life to care for his elderly mother until her death in August 2014.  He ascribes his transition from a warrior- to a caregiver-centric archetype as the central experience that helped him to understand and cope with the unique psychological demands involved with caring for an elderly parent up to their death. Central to the psychological health of the carer are coping strategies for dealing with changes in personal core identity that occur when caregivers transition from their pre-caregiver identities into caregivers, and from that identity, once the care role has ceased, to a post-caring identity. The smoothness and duration of the transition into each phase is determined by psychological self-knowledge, which he believes plays a vital role in helping untrained family caregivers better understand themselves and their own reactions to the unique and challenging pressures that domestic caregiving creates. This issue becomes increasingly relevant as the population ages, the State is unable to fund care for the aged and the duty of care falls to family members.

Campaign.  Owing to the excessive amount of time he spent on police bail or other measures that kept his career and life on hold for two-and-a-half years, Stankovic supports the campaign to restrict police bail to durations that are reasonable. Organised and led by Westbourne Communications, the Justice Delayed Justice Denied campaign includes many prominent activists from Parliament, the legal profession, the media and from civil and human rights campaigners. The aims of the campaign were set out in a letter to newspaper editors on 2nd December 2014.

Charity
The MCC Centre of Excellence, Sri Lanka.  In the wake of the 2004 Boxing Day tsunami, in 2005, Stankovic became the third person, and first solo person, to complete the Greystoke Mountain Marathon in under ten days. At 315 miles in length and incorporating 100,000' of ascent and descent, it is Britain's toughest mountain marathon taking in 202 fell tops over 2000' in height within the Lake District National Park. In completing the challenge, he raised sufficient funds to initiate the building of a centre of academic and sporting excellence for children and young people in Seenegama, Sri Lanka, funded for the most part by the Marylebone Cricket Club.

The Braveheart Programme Military Charity.  In 2009 he co-founded The Braveheart Programme, a British military charity that funds scientific research using the very latest neuro-imaging technology at Oxford University's Department of Neuro-Science to seek neurological markers for Combat Related Post Traumatic Stress disorder (PTSD) among the veteran population. It is ground-breaking research that promises not only to help further understanding of this age old wound of war, but will also have beneficial spin-offs to civilians suffering from PTSD. The Charity is currently funding a 60-month research project at Oxford University.

References

1962 births
Living people
People educated at Plymouth College
British Parachute Regiment officers
Graduates of the Royal Military Academy Sandhurst
British people of Serbian descent
Members of the Order of the British Empire
Date of birth missing (living people)